The 1927 Wellington City mayoral election was part of the New Zealand local elections held that same year. In 1927, elections were held for the Mayor of Wellington plus other local government positions including fifteen councillors. The polling was conducted using the standard first-past-the-post electoral method.

Background
Mayor Charles Norwood declined to stand for a second term. In an open contest, architect and city councillor George Troup was elected mayor, defeating trade unionist and former councillor Charles Chapman.

Mayoralty results

Councillor results

References

Mayoral elections in Wellington
1927 elections in New Zealand
Politics of the Wellington Region
1920s in Wellington